The Craven  Group is a lithostratigraphical term referring to the succession of mudstone and limestone rock strata which occur in certain parts of northern and central England and northeast Wales in the United Kingdom within the Chadian to Yeadonian sub-Stages of the Carboniferous Period. Other lithologies including sandstones, siltstones and chert occur within the group. The Group is subdivided into numerous formations, some of which previously enjoyed group status. In stratigraphic order (uppermost/youngest at top), these are:
Bowland Shale Formation (mudstone and siltstone)
Pendleside Limestone Formation (interbedded limestone and mudstone, conglomerate)
Hodderense Limestone Formation
Hodder Mudstone Formation (limestone and mudstone)

The Craven Group unconformably overlies the Bowland High Group and elsewhere the Clwyd Limestone Group. It is succeeded (overlain) by the Millstone Grit Group

References

See also
Geology of Lancashire

Carboniferous System of Europe
Stratigraphy of the United Kingdom